This is a list of visitor attractions of Tabriz, Iran.

Bridges (Historical)
Aji River bridge, an old bridge on the Aji River, beside the airport street 
Ghari Bridge, historical bridges on the Ghuri River

Churches
Armenian church of Adontist
Armenian church of Saint Mary
Assyrian church
Catholic church of Tabriz

Hamams (Turkish bath)
Historic Nobar Hamami 
Ferdowsi Hamami
Nobar bath

Houses (Historical)
Amir Nezam House
Behnam House (School of Architecture, Islamic art university of Tabriz)
Boulourchian House 
Constitutional House of Tabriz
House of Sheykh ol Islam
Sharbatoglu House
Ghadaki House

Monuments
Ark-e Tabriz
Bazaar of Tabriz
Charm Sazi-e Khosravi (faculty of Applied Arts)
Ruins of Rabe Rashidi University
Saat Tower (Tabriz Municipality)
Tabriz Fire Fighting Tower
Tabriz Railway Station

Mosques 
Blue Mosque (Göy Masjid)
Jameh Mosque of Tabriz
Saheb ol Amr
Shohada Mosque

Museums
Museum of Azarbaijan  
Museum of Qajar (Amir Nezam House)
Shahryar Literature Museum (House of Late Poet Shahryar)
Museum of Ostad Bohtouni  in Maqbarat-ol-Shoarapark
Measures Museum
Museum of Nature
Museum of "Iran municipalities history" in Saat Tower (municipality of Tabriz)

Parks and Gardens
Golestan Park (Golestan garden) 
Baghlar Baghi
Shah Gholi park
Khaqani Park

Shrines and Tombs
Boq'e Imamzade Ibrahim
Maqbaratoshoara (Tomb of Poets)
Seyed Hamzeh shrine
Shrine of On ibn ali
Tomb of Two Kamals

Streets (Historical)
Tarbiyat street
Ferdowsi street
Shahnaz street

Tabriz

Tabriz